Knoxville is an unincorporated community in Jefferson County, in the U.S. state of Ohio.

History
Knoxville was laid out in 1816, and named for the township in which it is located, Knox Township. A post office was established at Knoxville in 1816, and remained in operation until 1907.

References

Unincorporated communities in Jefferson County, Ohio
Unincorporated communities in Ohio